Wild Rice is an unincorporated community in Cass County, North Dakota, United States.

History
Wild Rice was platted in 1884 when the railroad was extended to that point. A post office called Wild Rice was established in 1884, and remained in operation until 1970. The community was originally built up chiefly by French Canadians.

St Benedict Catholic Church 
The present St. Benedict's Church was constructed in 1913.  St. Benedict’s Cemetery has been the final resting place for Catholics since the 1880s with over 600 people interred.

References

Unincorporated communities in Cass County, North Dakota
Unincorporated communities in North Dakota